The Secunderabad–Hazrat Nizamuddin Duronto Express is a Duronto Express train of the Indian Railways connecting  (SC) to Delhi Hazrat Nizamuddin (NZM). It is the fastest train between New Delhi and Secunderabad with a travel time of 22 hours.

Coaches
The 12285 / 86 Secunderabad Hazrat Nizamuddin Duronto Express presently has 1 AC 1st Class, 3 AC 2 tier, 5 AC 3 tier, 8 Slepper Class & 1 End on Generator, 1 SLRD coaches. In addition, it also carries a pantry car.

As is customary with most train services in India, coach composition may be amended at the discretion of Indian Railways depending on demand.

Locomotive
In Both the directions this trains was hauled by a Lallaguda-based WAP-7 locomotive on its entire journey.

Service
The 12285 Secunderabad Hazrat Nizamuddin Duronto Express covers the distance of 1660 kilometres in 22 hours 00 mins  & in 22 hours 15 mins as 12286 Secunderabad Hazrat Nizamuddin Duronto Express.

As the average speed of the train is above , as per Indian Railways rules, its fare includes a Superfast Express surcharge.

Stoppage

Gallery

Time Table